Reclaim your Brain is a 2007 German film directed by Hans Weingartner.

Cast 
 Moritz Bleibtreu - Rainer
 Elsa Sophie Gambard - Pegah
 Milan Peschel - Phillip
 Gregor Bloéb - Maiwald
 Tom Jahn - Bernd
 Irshad Panjatan - Gopal

External links
 

German comedy-drama films
Films set in Berlin
Films directed by Hans Weingartner
2000s German films